Acıbadem Üniversitesi Spor Kulübü, is a Turkish professional basketball club based in Istanbul which plays Turkish Basketball League (TBL). Their home arena is Acıbadem Üniversitesi Sports Hall with a capacity of 500 seats. The team was founded by Acıbadem University in 2014.

External links 
  Acıbadem Üniversitesi Spor Kulübü, Official website
  Acıbadem Üniversitesi, TBF Profile

Basketball teams in Turkey
Basketball teams established in 2014
Sport in Istanbul
2014 establishments in Turkey